Tabuldak (Tubılğaq) is a rural locality (a village) in Kashkalashinsky Selsoviet, Blagovarsky District, Bashkortostan, Russia. The population was 12 as of 2010. There are 2 streets.

Geography 
Tabuldak is located 14 km northeast of Yazykovo (the district's administrative centre) by road. Kashkalashi is the nearest rural locality.

References 

Rural localities in Blagovarsky District